Pisulina is a genus of submarine cave snails, marine gastropod mollusks in the family Neritiliidae.

Species
Species within the genus Pisulina include:

 Pisulina maxima Kano & Kase, 2000
 Pisulina tenuis Kano & Kase, 2000

References

Neritiliidae